Wendel is an unincorporated community in Lassen County, California. Wendel's ZIP Code is 96136.

The Wendel post office opened in 1915 (when it was transferred from Purser), closed in 1920, and re-opened in 1921. The name Wendel was bestowed by Thomas Moran, the president of the Nevada–California–Oregon Railway, for a friend.

Climate
This region experiences warm (but not hot) and dry summers, with no average monthly temperatures above 71.6 °F.  According to the Köppen Climate Classification system, Wendel has a warm-summer Mediterranean climate, abbreviated "Csb" on climate maps.

References

Unincorporated communities in California
Unincorporated communities in Lassen County, California